Elio "Lito" Álvarez (born 5 December 1947) is a former professional tennis player from Argentina.

Career
Álvarez played collegiate tennis for the UCLA Bruins, on the same team as Jimmy Connors, in the early 1970s.

He appeared in eight Davis Cup ties for Argentina from 1970 to 1978. He played mainly in doubles rubbers but had two wins in the singles, against Carlos Kirmayr and Luis Felipe Tavares, both of Brazil. His doubles record was 4/4 and his partners included Guillermo Vilas and José Luis Clerc.

Álvarez made the second round of the singles draw at a Grand Slam tournament five times, from 14 attempts, but was unable to progress any further.

As well as being runner-up at the Dutch Open in 1977, Álvarez made six Grand Prix/WCT doubles finals, for one win, at São Paulo in 1976.

Grand Prix/WCT career finals

Singles: 1 (0–1)

Doubles: 6 (1–5)

References

External links
 
 
 

1947 births
Living people
Argentine male tennis players
UCLA Bruins men's tennis players
Tennis players from Buenos Aires